Thug Matrimony: Married to the Streets is the sixth studio album by American rapper Trick Daddy. It was released on October 26, 2004 via Slip-N-Slide/Atlantic Records. The album debuted at #2 on the Billboard 200 with 145,000 copies sold in the first week released. It was certified Gold by the Recording Industry Association of America on December 1, 2004.

Recording sessions took place at 4-Star Studios, at TDD Studios, at Circle House Studios, at Platinum Recording Studios in Miami, at The Orange Grove in Los Angeles, and at Sho Nuff in Atlanta. Production was handled by several record producers, including Cool & Dre, Gorilla Tek, Jim Jonsin, Mr. Collipark and Scott Storch. It features guest appearances from Jazze Pha, Benji Brown, CeeLo Green, Deuce Komradz, Dirtbag, Kase, Khia, Lil' Jon, Ludacris, Money Mark Diggla, Ron Isley, Smoke, Tampa Tony, T.I., Trey Songz, Trina, Twista, Ying-Yang Twins and Young Jeezy.

The song "Let's Go" was released as the lead single that rocketed the album's success and remains Trick Daddy's most successful single, reaching number 7 on the Billboard Hot 100. It was used in the trailers for 2007 film Stomp the Yard. Mike Caren-produced "Sugar (Gimme Some)" reached number 20 on the Billboard Hot 100 and has a remix with a verse from Lil' Kim. In the music video for "Sugar (Gimme Some)" Ludacris's appearance in the song was replaced by Lil' Kim. The song "J.O.D.D." was used in the 2005 movies The 40-Year-Old Virgin and Into the Blue. The song was also used in the soundtrack of the 2005 racing video game Midnight Club 3: DUB Edition.

Track listing

Notes
 signifies a co-producer.

Sample credits
Track 3 contains excerpts from "Crazy Train" written by John Osbourne, Robert Daisley and Randy Rhoads, as performed by Ozzy Osbourne
Track 5 contains a sample from "Never Leave You Lonely" written by Louis Johnson, Vallery Johnson and Peggy Jones, as performed by The Brothers Johnson
Track 6 contains a sample from "I'm Your Puppet" written by Linda Olden and Dan Penn, as performed by Foster Sylvers
Track 7 contains excerpts from "Hold Onto Your Dreams" written by Vernon Bullock and Ivy Jo Hunter, as performed by the Wee Gees
Track 9 contains an interpolation of "Sugar On My Tongue" written by David Byrne
Track 13 contains an interpolation of "Cruisin'" written by William Robinson Jr. and Marvin Traplin
Track 16 contains an interpolation of "If It Isn't Love" written by James Harris and Terry Lewis
Track 17 contains interpolations of "No Parking On The Dance Floor" written by Vincent Calloway, Bobby Lovelace and William Simmons, and "Ffun" written by Michael Cooper

Charts

Weekly charts

Year-end charts

Certifications

See also
List of number-one rap albums of 2004 (U.S.)
List of Billboard number-one R&B albums of 2004

References

External links

2004 albums
Trick Daddy albums
Atlantic Records albums
Albums produced by Jazze Pha
Albums produced by Cool & Dre
Albums produced by Jim Jonsin
Albums produced by Happy Perez
Albums produced by Scott Storch
Albums produced by Mr. Collipark